The 2017 Open de Rennes was a professional tennis tournament played on hard courts. It was the eleventh edition of the tournament and part of the 2017 ATP Challenger Tour. It took place in Rennes, France between 24 and 29 January 2017.

Singles main-draw entrants

Seeds

1 Rankings are as of January 16, 2016.

Other entrants
The following players received wildcards into the singles main draw:
  Geoffrey Blancaneaux
  Evan Furness
  Maxime Janvier
  Tristan Lamasine

The following player received entry into the singles main draw using a protected ranking:
  Blaž Kavčič

The following players received entry from the qualifying draw:
  Rémi Boutillier
  Edward Corrie
  Stefanos Tsitsipas
  Jürgen Zopp

The following player received entry as a lucky loser:
  Uladzimir Ignatik

Champions

Singles

 Uladzimir Ignatik def.  Andrey Rublev 6–7(6–8), 6–3, 7–6(7–5).

Doubles

 Evgeny Donskoy /  Mikhail Elgin def.  Julian Knowle /  Jonathan Marray 6–4, 3–6, [11–9].

External links
Official Website

2017 ATP Challenger Tour
2017
2017 in French tennis
January 2017 sports events in France